Gordon Claude "Chris" Griffin (October 31, 1915 – June 18, 2005) was an American jazz trumpeter.

Griffin was born in Binghamton, New York, United States, but moved to White Plains when he was ten; he began playing trumpet at age twelve, and played in dance bands as a teenager. He worked with Charlie Barnet, Rudy Vallee, Miff Mole, Mildred Bailey, Teddy Wilson, and Joe Haymes in the mid-1930s, and did work as a studio musician for CBS radio broadcasting. In 1936 he joined Benny Goodman's big band, remaining with him until 1939. He appeared in several movies as a member of Goodman's ensemble, such as The Big Broadcast of 1937 and Hollywood Hotel, and was the last surviving member of Goodman's band to perform in the first major jazz event at Carnegie Hall which was recorded and later released as The Famous 1938 Carnegie Hall Jazz Concert. In 1940 he played with Jimmy Dorsey and occasionally returned to Goodman's band in the 1940s and 1950s, but primarily worked on staff at CBS from the late 1930s onward. He played trumpet for radio television soundtracks into the 1980s, including for The Ed Sullivan Show, The Jackie Gleason Show, Lucky Strike Hit Parade, The Philip Morris Playhouse, and Camel Caravan''.

Griffin and Pee Wee Erwin co-founded a trumpet education school which operated from 1966 to 1970, and toured with Warren Covington in Europe in 1974. He worked with Tex Beneke, Bud Freeman, and Warren Vaché Sr. later in his career. In the 1980s he led an ensemble of his own which included sidemen such as Marty Napoleon, Sonny Igoe, Jane Jarvis, and Major Holley.

Griffin was married to vocalist Helen O'Brien for 60 years until her death in 2000. The couple had four sons, one of whom also died in 2000, and two daughters. He died aged 89 in 2005 of melanoma.

References

Further reading

American jazz trumpeters
American male trumpeters
20th-century trumpeters
20th-century American male musicians
Jazz musicians from New York (state)
American male jazz musicians
People from Binghamton, New York
Deaths from cancer in Connecticut
Deaths from melanoma
1915 births
2005 deaths